Fold, folding or foldable may refer to:

Arts, entertainment, and media
Fold (album), the debut release by Australian rock band Epicure
Fold (poker), in the game of poker, to discard one's hand and forfeit interest in the current pot
Above the fold and below the fold, the positioning of news items on a newspaper's front page according to perceived importance
Paper folding, or origami, the art of folding paper

Science, technology, and mathematics

Biology
Protein folding, the physical process by which a polypeptide folds into its characteristic and functional three-dimensional structure
Folding@home, a powerful distributed-computing project for simulating protein folding
Fold coverage, quality of a DNA sequence
Skin fold, an area of skin that folds

Computing
Fold (higher-order function), a type of programming operation on data structures
fold (Unix), a computer program used to wrap lines to fit in a specified width
Folding (DSP implementation), a transformation technique using in DSP architecture implementation
Folding (signal processing), an aspect of aliasing
Folding editor, a text editor that supports text folding or code folding, allowing the user to hide and reveal blocks of text
case folding is the conversion of letter case in a string
Constant folding, a compiler optimization technique
Folding@home, a powerful distributed-computing project for simulating protein folding

Electronics
Foldable display
Flexible display

Other uses in science and mathematics
Fold (geology), one or a stack of originally flat and planar surfaces that are bent or curved as a result of plastic deformation
Fold (higher-order function), in functional programming, fold refers to a family of higher-order functions that analyze a recursive data structure and through use of a given combining opera
Folding (chemistry), the process by which a molecule assumes its shape or conformation
Folding (Dynkin diagram), in Lie theory, a way of obtaining one Dynkin diagram from another
Fold change, a measure of the difference between two quantities
e-folding, exponential growth or decay
Polygon folding, or polyhedron folding

Other uses
Amicus Therapeutics, NASDAQ stock trading symbol FOLD
Book folding, in book production
Foldable smartphone, a smartphone with a folding form factor 
Folding bicycle, a bicycle designed to fold into a compact form
Folding bridge, a bridge that can be folded, mainly to open for higher boats
Folding clothes, allows apparel to be stored compactly, prevents unwanted creasing, preserves wanted creases, and presents them in a pleasing manner, for instance when displayed on sale in stores
Pen (enclosure), or sheep fold, a sheep pen in British English
-fold, a feature in British toponymy
Samsung Galaxy Fold, a smartphone
Scottish Fold, a cat breed

See also

Bend (disambiguation)
Crease (disambiguation)
Folder (disambiguation)